The 2004 Indian general election polls in Assam were held for 14 seats in the state. The result was United Progressive Alliance winning 9 out of the 14 seats, while the National Democratic Alliance, captured only 2 seats.  Asom Gana Parishad managed to get 2 seats.

In Assam there was a three-cornered contest between Congress, BJP and Asom Gana Parishad (the main regional party of the state). Congress contested all 14 seats in the states, BJP 12 and AGP 12. BJP supported one JD(U) candidate and the Bodo nationalist candidate in Kokrajhar. The left parties (CPI(M), CPI and CPI(ML)L) had a joint front. Congress won nine seats. AGP got a comeback, winning two seats. BJP also won two seats, although one of them was the popular singer Bhupen Hazarika. Hazarika stood in Guwahati, and his election ought to reflect his personal popularity, rather than that of the party he had just joined. CPI(ML)L lost its seat in the Karbi Anlong hills, largely due to a split in their mass organisation there and the resurgence of communal violence in the area. In Kokrajhar the Bodo nationalist and NDA-supported candidate, Sansuma Khunggur Bwiswmuthiary, retained his seat.

Results by Alliance

 Note: UPA was not in existence in 1999, instead the number of seats won in 1999, represents the seats won by Indian National Congress
 Note: Left front, was not part of the UPA, in 2004, instead gave outside support.

Results by Party

Results by constituency
Keys:

Results by constituency

 
 

 
 

Assam
Indian general elections in Assam
2000s in Assam